"Just Like a Woman" is a 1966 song by Bob Dylan.

Just Like a Woman may also refer to:

, by Gilbert M. Anderson
Just Like a Woman (1912 film)
Just like a Woman (1923 film)
Just like a Woman (1939 film)
Just like a Woman (1967 film)
Just like a Woman (1992 film)
Just like a Woman (2012 film)
Just Like a Woman (Kikki Danielsson album), a 1981 album by Kikki Danielsson
Just Like a Woman (Barb Jungr album), a 2008 album by Barb Jungr